Auburn Township is one of the sixteen townships of Crawford County, Ohio, United States. As of the 2010 census there were 795 people living in the township, 515 of whom lived in the unincorporated portions of the township.

Geography
Located in the northeastern corner of the county, it borders the following townships:
Richmond Township, Huron County - north
New Haven Township, Huron County - northeast
Plymouth Township, Richland County - east
Sharon Township, Richland County - southeast corner
Vernon Township - south
Sandusky Township - southwest corner
Cranberry Township - west

The village of Tiro is located in southern Auburn Township, and the unincorporated communities of Mechanicsburg and Waynesburg are located in the township's south and northwest, respectively.

Name and history
Auburn Township was established in 1820.

Statewide, other Auburn Townships are located in Geauga and Tuscarawas counties.

Government
The township is governed by a three-member board of trustees, who are elected in November of odd-numbered years to a four-year term beginning on the following January 1. Two are elected in the year after the presidential election and one is elected in the year before it. There is also an elected township fiscal officer, who serves a four-year term beginning on April 1 of the year after the election, which is held in November of the year before the presidential election. Vacancies in the fiscal officership or on the board of trustees are filled by the remaining trustees.

References

External links
County website

Townships in Crawford County, Ohio
Townships in Ohio